Ilemodes is a genus of moths in the family Erebidae first described by George Hampson in 1900.

Species
Ilemodes astriga Hampson, 1916
Ilemodes heterogyna Hampson, 1900
Ilemodes isogyna Romieux, 1935

References

External links

Arctiini
Moth genera